Gokana kingdom are among the six kingdoms of the Ogoni people in Ogoni (also Ogoniland) in the Niger Delta region of Nigeria. "Gokana kingdom" has geographic, historic and ethno-linguistic elements with some 130,000 Gokana language speakers located in the Gokana Local Government Area in Rivers State. Gokana contains a tremendous number of villages, including Lewe, B. Dere, K. Dere, Kpor, Mogho, Bomu, Bodo, Gio-koo, Nwe-ol, Alli D. Bera, Biara, Deeyor, Boghor, Barako and Yeghe.

Gokana is a local government area that is located in Rivers state, in the South South geopolitical zone of Nigeria. The headquarters of the LGA is found in the town of Kpor while the Gokana area comprises several towns and villages which include Nwenbiara, Yeghe, Gbe, Goi, Barako, Kibangba, Bomu, Deken, and Bera. The estimated population of Gokana LGA is 194,713 inhabitants with the vast majority of the people that inhabit the area being members of the Ogoni ethnic sub-division. The Gokana kingdom speaks the dialect of the Ogoni language as it is predominantly spoken in the area. Christianity is the religion that is mostly practiced although they still have traditionalist in the area. The Gbere Mene of Gokana LGA is the traditional administrator of the LGA while important festivals held in the area include the Naa Bira Dae festival.

Geography
Gokana LGA sits on a total area measuring 126 square kilometres km2 and a population of 228,828 at the 2006 census. And has several rivers and tributaries flowing through its territory. The average temperature of the LGA is 26°C while the average humidity level of the area is 87 percent.

Economy 
Gokana people are mainly farmers as farming is a key economic activity in Gokana LGA with a number of crops such as plantain, oil palm, cassava, okro and banana are being grown in the area. They are also fishermen as fishing is another important occupation engaged by the people of Gokana as the area has many rivers and tributaries being rich in seafood. Other important economic enterprises of the people of Gokana include trades, the making of fishing nets, and the construction of canoes.

References

Further reading
 
Saro-Wiwa, Ken, Genocide in Nigeria: The Ogoni Tragedy, Saros (1992), .

 
Ethnic groups in Nigeria
Indigenous peoples of West Africa